Lego Lee (born January 22, 1986) is a Taiwanese actor and singer best known for his roles in the television series In a Good Way, Aim High and Love Cuisine. Lee holds a master's degree in sport management from Dayeh University, and holds coaching and umpiring qualifications in swimming. He was also a basketball player and was a Taipei-wide high school high jump champion.

Filmography

Television series

Film

Music video

Published works

Discography

Extended plays

Soundtrack albums

Awards and nominations

References

External links 
 
 
 
 
 

1986 births
Taiwanese male television actors
Taiwanese male film actors
Living people
Male actors from Taipei
21st-century Taiwanese male actors
21st-century Taiwanese  male singers